

Eleven special routes of U.S. Highway 151 (US 151) exist.  Three of which are located in Iowa and the other eight are in Wisconsin.

Cedar Rapids business loop

U.S. Highway 151 Business (US 151 Business) is designated along the former alignment of US 151 through Cedar Rapids and Marion, Iowa.  US 151 Business begins at exit 248, the intersection of US 30 / US 218 and US 151 in Cedar Rapids.  US 151 Business follows Williams Boulevard northeast to 1st Avenue, which it follows for the rest of its path through Cedar Rapids.  1st Avenue becomes Marion Boulevard in Marion.  US 151 Business follows 7th Avenue to its northern terminus, the intersection of US 151 and Iowa Highway 13 (Iowa 13).

Through Cedar Rapids, US 151 Business is officially designated as Iowa 922, though it is never signed as such.

Monticello business loop

U.S. Highway 151 Business (US 151 Business) in Monticello was created in 2004 when US 151 was expanded and rerouted around Monticello.  US 151 Business in Monticello begins at exit 68 of US 151.  It is co-signed with Jones County Route X44 until the Monticello city limits.  In Monticello, US 151 Business follows Main Street.  Between Oak Street and 1st Street, Iowa 38 overlaps US 151 Business.  The northern terminus of US 151 Business is an at-grade intersection with US 151.

Cascade business loop

It starts west of Cascade at a junction with US 151. Within the city, the highway is known mostly as 1st Avenue and intersects with Iowa 136. Shortly before its eastern terminus, the route turns onto Fox Street.

Platteville business loop

Business U.S. Highway 151 (Bus. The first portion of the highway is shared by County Trunk Highway D. In downtown Platteville, the highway intersects with Wisconsin Highway 80. It is known as Dubuque Road for most of its length.

Mineral Point business loop

Business U.S. Highway 151 (Bus. When it starts at US 151 outside of Mineral Point, it is concurrent with County Trunk Highway O. The concurrency is very short, and ends just after it starts. Inside Mineral Point, the route becomes concurrent with Wisconsin Highway 39. After this concurrency ends, it becomes concurrent with Wisconsin Highway 23. It then heads towards US 151 and ends there, intersecting County Trunk Highway YD along the way.

Major intersections

Mount Horeb business loop

Business U.S. Highway 151 (Bus. US 151) is a former segment of US 18/151 between Exits 65 and 69 within Mount Horeb.  The route is also shared by US 18 Business, as well as parts of Wisconsin Highway 78 and Dane County Road ID.

Verona business loop

Business U.S. Highway 151 (Bus. US 151) is a former segment of US 18/151 within Verona.  The route is also shared by US 18 Business and Dane County Road MV. US 18 Business/151 Business/CR MV begins at a pair of flyover interchanges with US 18/151 on Exit 76 west of Verona. Eastbound Exit 76 runs directly into the business routes on West Verona Avenue, while westbound Exit 76 connects to the business routes by way of Epic Lane. From there, the business routes run east-northeast as a four-lane divided highway until the intersection with Legion Street, where it becomes a local two-lane undivided road. At the intersection with North and South Main Streets (Dane County Road M), West Verona Avenue becomes East Verona Avenue, making a brief reverse curve to the left before returning to its previous trajectory at School Street and becoming a four-lane divided highway east of there. US BUS 18/151/CR MV ends east of Verona at Exit 81 on US 18/151, but only with an eastbound on-ramp and westbound off-ramp.

Sun Prairie business loop

Business U.S. Highway 151 (Bus. Formerly the mainline of US 151, it passes through downtown and connects two exits on the freeway portion of US 151. Part of the route is shared with Wisconsin Highway 19.

Columbus business loop

Business U.S. Highway 151 (Bus. Formerly the mainline of US 151, it passes through downtown and connects two exits on the freeway portion of US 151. Wisconsin Highway 73 overlaps the entire route.

Beaver Dam business loop

Business U.S. Highway 151 (Bus. Formerly the mainline of US 151, it passes through downtown and connects two exits on the freeway portion of US 151. Part of the route is shared with Wisconsin Highway 33.

Waupun business loop

Business U.S. Highway 151 (Bus. Formerly the mainline of US 151, it passes through downtown and connects two exits on the freeway portion of US 151. Parts of the route is shared with Wisconsin Highways 49 and 26.

References

51-1
151
S51-1
51-1